Premnath Ramnath (born 7 April 1962) is a Trinidadian cricketer. He played in four first-class matches for Trinidad and Tobago from 1981 to 1984.

See also
 List of Trinidadian representative cricketers

References

External links
 

1962 births
Living people
Trinidad and Tobago cricketers